William Guidara (born 1979) is an American restaurateur based in New York City. Along with chef Daniel Humm, Guidara co-owned the Make It Nice hospitality group, established in 2011, which owns and operates Eleven Madison Park, NoMad New York, NoMad Los Angeles, NoMad Las Vegas, NoMad Bar and Made Nice.

Background and career
A native of Sleepy Hollow, New York, Guidara graduated from the Cornell University School of Hotel Administration in 2001. Guidara began his dining room career at Wolfgang Puck's Spago in Beverly Hills. He then went on to various roles in Danny Meyer's Union Square Hospitality Group, including at Tabla, Café 2 and the restaurants at the Museum of Modern Art.

In 2006 Guidara became the General Manager of Eleven Madison Park, working with Humm. In 2011, Guidara and Humm purchased the restaurant from Union Square Hospitality Group. 

In 2012, Guidara and Humm opened NoMad New York and the separate NoMad Bar in 2014. In April 2017, Guidara and Humm opened Made Nice, a fast casual restaurant in New York's Nomad neighborhood. In 2018, Guidara and Humm opened NoMad Los Angeles, their first restaurant outside of New York City, followed by NoMad Las Vegas. In 2019, Guidara and Humm announced that they were ending their partnership, with Humm buying out Guidara. As of 2019 Guidara was planning to start his own restaurant group.

Guidara is the co-author of four books with Humm: Eleven Madison Park: The Cookbook (Little Brown, 2011), I Love New York: Ingredients and Recipes (Ten Speed, 2013), The NoMad Cookbook and Eleven Madison Park: the Next Chapter.

Awards

James Beard Foundation Awards
 2016 James Beard Foundation Award – Outstanding Service, Eleven Madison Park
 2014 James Beard Foundation Award – Outstanding Bar Program, NoMad New York
 2008 James Beard Foundation Award – Outstanding Wine Service, Eleven Madison Park

Michelin
 Eleven Madison Park, 3 stars 2012-2018 
 NoMad New York, 1 star 2013-2018 
Additional Awards
 2016 Wall Street Journal – Innovator Awards{{

Books

 2022: Unreasonable Hospitality (Publisher: Optimism Press)
 2017: Eleven Madison Park: The Next Chapter (Publisher: Ten Speed)
 2015: The NoMad Cookbook (Publisher: Ten Speed)
 2013: I Love New York: Ingredients and Recipes (Publisher: Ten Speed)
 2011: Eleven Madison Park: The Cookbook (Publisher: Little Brown)

References

1979 births
American restaurateurs
Cornell University School of Hotel Administration alumni
Living people
Date of birth missing (living people)